Fræna is a former municipality in Møre og Romsdal county, Norway.  It was part of the region of Romsdal.  The municipality was located on the Romsdal peninsula surrounding the Frænfjorden, the eastern shore of the Julsundet strait, and includes most of the Hustadvika area.  It also included the now-abandoned Bjørnsund islands.

The main village and administrative centre in Fræna was Elnesvågen with over 2,300 inhabitants. Moxy Engineering, Hustad Marmor, and Tine Meierier are all factories located in Elnesvågen.  Other villages in Fræna included Hustad, Bud, Tornes, Sylte, Malme, and Aureosen. The area is nice for hiking, including the mountains are Heiane/Lågheiane and Jendemsfjellet.

At the time if its dissolution in 2020, the  municipality is the 250th largest by area out of the 422 municipalities in Norway. Fræna is the 115th most populous municipality in Norway with a population of 9,775.

General information

The municipality of Fræna was established in 1840 when it was separated from the municipality of Akerø.  The original municipality was named Vaagø and it surrounded the Frænfjorden. Later the name was changed to Fræna.

During the 1960s, there were many municipal mergers across Norway due to the work of the Schei Committee. On 1 January 1964, Bud Municipality (population: 1,610), Hustad Municipality (population: 2,196), and Fræna Municipality (population: 3,430) were merged to form a new, larger municipality of Fræna.

On 1 January 2020, the neighboring municipalities of Eide and Fræna merged into the new Hustadvika Municipality.

Name
The municipality was named after the Frænfjorden. The meaning of the name is unknown, but it might be derived from frænn which means "bright" or "shiny". Before 1865, the parish and municipality were named Vaagø (and the main church was Vågøy Church, which also was historically spelled Vaagø). From 1865 to 1918, the name was written Frænen, and since 1918 it has had its current spelling, Fræna.

Coat of arms
The coat of arms was granted on 15 May 1995. The arms show three blue waves on a gold background.  The arms were chosen to symbolize the municipality's connection to the sea.

Churches
The Church of Norway had four parishes within the municipality of Fræna. It is part of the Molde domprosti (arch-deanery) in the Diocese of Møre.

Geography

The municipality of Fræna sits on the northwestern end of the Romsdal Peninsula.  The Norwegian Sea lies to the north, the Harøyfjorden, Julsundet strait, and Aukra Municipality lie to the west, Molde Municipality lies to the south, and Gjemnes Municipality and Eide Municipality lie to the east.

The Frænfjorden cuts into the middle of the municipality.  The coastal areas are low and marshy while the interior of the municipality is mountainous.  Two of the more notable mountains are Jendemsfjellet and Heiane.  The Bjørnsund islands lie off the northwestern coast of Fræna.  They are now uninhabited, but the Bjørnsund Lighthouse is still in operation.

Government

The municipal council of Fræna was made up of 31 representatives that were elected to four year terms. The party breakdown for the final municipal council was as follows:

See also
List of former municipalities of Norway

References

External links

Municipal fact sheet from Statistics Norway 
http://www.frena.net  - Homepage edited by a local enthusiast
Romsdals Budstikke newspaper 

 
Hustadvika (municipality)
Former municipalities of Norway
1840 establishments in Norway
2020 disestablishments in Norway
Populated places disestablished in 2020